Dezmon "Dez" Wallace Giraldi (born 24 March 1986 in Wollongong, New South Wales, Australia) is a former footballer.

Club career
Giraldi signed with A-League club Adelaide United for the 2006–07 season, after a four-week stint with the Central Coast Mariners during the 2005-06 A-League season. He has represented Australia at Under-17 and Under-23 level, while also being part of Empoli's squad in the Italian Serie A. Giraldi gave up his squad number when Romario arrived in Adelaide so the Brazilian could wear the #11 he had worn all his career. Dez got the #23 he wanted when he first came to the club.

He was released by Adelaide United at the end of the 2007–2008 season. He moved to NSW Premier League club Wollongong Wolves before signing a contract with A-League club Sydney FC to replace the injured Brendon Santalab. In an interview, Giraldi spoke about  anxiety, which he had experienced.

References

External links
 FFA - Olyroo profile

1986 births
Living people
Sportspeople from Wollongong
Australian people of Italian descent
Association football forwards
Australian soccer players
Australian expatriate soccer players
Adelaide United FC players
A-League Men players
Empoli F.C. players
Australian Institute of Sport soccer players
Central Coast Mariners FC players
Sydney FC players